is a puzzle series developed by Konami.

Gameplay
The gameplay of the series is similar to other matching-based puzzle games, such as Puyo Puyo, being a battle game between one player and either a human or CPU opponent. Balls will descend down the screen, in colours red, yellow, blue, or green. Large balls are cleared if three or more are touching horizontally or vertically. When a large ball is cleared next to a small ball, that small ball is "unlocked" and becomes a large ball, and so can be matched with. If a combo of matches occurs, those balls are converted into , which results in small balls being added to the opponent's side, in a different pattern for each character.

The ball types are as follows:
 : Basic ball type, can be matched.
 : Appear "locked" and can be unlocked by matching large balls next to them.
 : Introduced in Susume! Taisen Puzzle-Dama. These balls are white in colour, and when they land, they convert all adjacent small balls to large balls.
 : Introduced in Susume! Taisen Puzzle-Dama. These balls are black in colour, and when they land, they convert all adjacent large balls to small balls.
 : Introduced in Susume! Taisen Puzzle-Dama. These balls are purple in colour, and are oriented in a certain direction. Where they land, they continue in the direction they are facing, "eating" small balls and removing them from the field. They stop when they reach the edge of the field or a large ball. They then convert the last small ball they "ate" into a large ball.

Games in the series

Taisen Puzzle-Dama (1994, Arcade)
Tsuyoshi Shikkari Shinasai: Taisen Puzzle-dama (1994, Super Famicom) - Tsuyoshi Shikkari Shinasai themed
TwinBee Taisen Puzzle-Dama (1994, PlayStation) - TwinBee themed
Tokimeki Memorial Taisen Puzzle-Dama (1995, Arcade, PlayStation, Sega Saturn, Windows 95, PlayStation Network) - Tokimeki Memorial themed
Chibi Maruko-chan no Taisen Puzzle-Dama (1995, Sega Saturn) - Chibi Maruko-chan themed
Susume! Taisen Puzzle-Dama (1996, Arcade, PlayStation)
Susume! Taisen Puzzle Dama: Tōkon! Marutama Chō (1998, Nintendo 64)
Puzzle-Dama (2001, Mobile Phones)
Tokimeki Memorial 2 Taisen Puzzle-Dama (2001, PlayStation) - Tokimeki Memorial 2 themed
Puzzle-Dama DX (2003, Mobile Phones)
Wagamama Fairy Mirmo de Pon! Taisen Mahō-Dama (2003, Game Boy Advance) - Mirmo! themed
Pop'n Taisen Puzzle-Dama Online (2004, PlayStation 2) - Pop'n Music themed
Tokimeki Memorial Girl's Side Taisen Puzzle-Dama (December 2004, mobile phones) - Tokimeki Memorial Girl's Side themed
Hell Girl Taisen Puzzle-Dama (2007, Mobile Phones) Hell Girl themed
Hayate no Gotoku!! Taisen Puzzle-Dama (2009, Mobile Phones) Hayate the Combat Butler themed
Castlevania Puzzle: Encore of the Night (2010, iOS, Windows Phone) Castlevania themed
Magical Academy Taisen Puzzle-Dama (2011, Mobile Phones) Magic Academy themed

Spin-offs 
A part of Konami Taisen Colosseum series
Puzzle de Knight (Mitsumete Knight)
Moeru! Taisen Puzzle-Dama (LovePlus +)
Puzzle-Dama Eleven (Winning Eleven Mobile)
New LovePlus

References 

Falling block puzzle games
Konami franchises
Video game franchises
Chibi Maruko-chan